Saint-Victor may refer to:

 Paul Bins, comte de Saint-Victor (1827–1881), French author

It is also the name or part of the name of several communes in France:

Saint-Victor, Allier, in the Allier  département 
Saint-Victor, Ardèche, in the Ardèche  département
Saint-Victor, Cantal, in the Cantal  département 
Saint-Victor, Dordogne, in the Dordogne  département
Saint-Victor-de-Buthon, in the Eure-et-Loir  département 
Saint-Victor-de-Cessieu, in the Isère  département 
Saint-Victor-de-Chrétienville, in the Eure  département 
Saint-Victor-de-Malcap, in the Gard  département
Saint-Victor-de-Morestel, in the Isère  département 
Saint-Victor-d'Épine, in the Eure  département
Saint-Victor-de-Réno, in the Orne  département 
Saint-Victor-des-Oules, in the Gard  département 
Saint-Victor-en-Marche, in the Creuse  département 
Saint-Victor-l'Abbaye, in the Seine-Maritime  département 
Saint-Victor-la-Coste, in the Gard département 
Saint-Victor-la-Rivière, in the Puy-de-Dôme  département
Saint-Victor-Malescours, in the Haute-Loire  département 
Saint-Victor-Montvianeix, in the Puy-de-Dôme  département
Saint-Victor-Rouzaud, in the Ariège  département 
Saint-Victor-sur-Arlanc, in the Haute-Loire  département
Saint-Victor-sur-Avre, in the Eure  département 
Saint-Victor-sur-Ouche, in the Côte-d'Or  département 
Saint-Victor-sur-Rhins, in the Loire  département 
Saint-Victor-et-Melvieu, in the Aveyron  département

It is also the name of a municipality in Canada:
Saint-Victor, Quebec

See also 
St. Victor (disambiguation), for saints named Victor